Reel Love is a 2011 American made-for-television romantic comedy film directed by Brian K. Roberts and starring LeAnn Rimes, Shawn Roberts, Christian Potenza and Burt Reynolds.

The film premiered on November 13, 2011, on CMT.

Plot

Holly Whitman (Rimes), a successful big city lawyer returns to her small hometown in Alabama when her father Wade (Reynolds) is admitted to the hospital. Once there she goes on a soulful journey to reconnect with family and friends and finds romance along the way.

Cast
 LeAnn Rimes as Holly Whitman
 Shawn Roberts as Jay Danville
 Christian Potenza as Everett Whitman
 Burt Reynolds as Wade Whitman
 Benjamin Ayres as Bobby Calgrove
 Mary Ashton as Mary Jo "MJ" Calgrove
 Jeff Roop as Carl Lindford
 Neil Crone as Tom Meyer
 Thomas Mitchell as Charlie Manfredi
 Tim Post as Bert Hay
 Naomi Snieckus as Charlene Hay
 Natalie Lisinska as Debbie Manfredi
 David Huband as Vern May 
 Joe Bostick as Colin Nellburg 
 Rebecca Kohler as Gayla Whitman

References

External links
 

2011 television films
2011 films
2011 romantic comedy films
American television films
American romantic comedy films
Entertainment One films
2010s American films
2010s English-language films